Grushevy (masculine), Grushevaya (feminine), or Grushevoye (neuter) is the name of several rural localities in Russia:
Grushevy, Krasnodar Krai, a khutor in Rodnikovsky Rural Okrug of Belorechensky District in Krasnodar Krai; 
Grushevy, Stavropol Krai, a khutor under the administrative jurisdiction of the city of krai significance of Stavropol in Stavropol Krai
Grushevoye, Republic of Crimea, a selo in Simferopolsky District of Republic of Crimea
Grushevoye, Primorsky Krai, a selo under the administrative jurisdiction of Dalnerechensk Town Under Krai Jurisdiction in Primorsky Krai